Area codes 613, 343, and 753 are telephone area codes in the North American Numbering Plan (NANP) for Ottawa and surrounding Eastern Ontario, Canada. Area code 613 is one of the 86 original North American area codes assigned in October 1947. Area code 343 was assigned to the numbering plan area in an overlay plan activated on May 17, 2010. Area code 753 was assigned as an additional overlay code for the numbering plan area, activated on March 26, 2022.

History 

Area code 613 was originally assigned to a numbering plan area that included all of Ontario with the exception of the Golden Horseshoe, which was assigned the area code 416. The numbering plan area has been split twice.  In 1953, the southwestern Ontario portion of 613 was combined with the western portion of 416 to become numbering plan area 519.  In 1957, the vast northwestern portion of 613 was combined with the northern portion of 519 to receive area code 705. Since 1957, 613 covers only eastern Ontario, an area extending from Brighton and Deep River eastward to Saint Regis, Quebec.

Ottawa and its twin city in Quebec, Gatineau, fall on the boundary between 613 and Quebec's area code 819.   However, Ottawa shares a local calling area with the former city of Hull, Quebec (now part of the city of Gatineau).  As a result, for 46 years, a call could be completed between Ottawa and Hull with only seven digits.   A similar situation prevailed in the Washington metropolitan area across three jurisdictions – Washington itself and parts of Maryland and Virginia.

While there are fewer than two million people in the geographic area covered by 613, the bulk of that population lives in the Ottawa area.  To preserve seven-digit dialling between Ottawa and Hull, an exchange code protection scheme was implemented so that the same seven-digit local number could not be assigned on both sides of the National Capital Region. Technically, it was only necessary that no two prefixes within the same local calling area be duplicates, but the code protection as implemented reserved the numbers across both area codes. This meant that if a 1-819 number was being used in Hull, the corresponding 1-613 number could not be used anywhere in eastern Ontario, even in areas a safe distance from the National Capital Region such as Brighton.  Similarly, if a 1-613 number was being used in Ottawa–Carleton, the corresponding 1-819 number could not be used anywhere in western Quebec.  Federal government offices in Hull duplicated their entire allocation of multiple exchanges worth of numbers available in 613 as part of a "dual dialability" scheme.

By the turn of the century, both 613 and 819 were close to exhaustion due to Canada's inefficient number allocation system.  Every competitive local exchange carrier received blocks of 10,000 numbers (corresponding to a single prefix) in every rate centre in which it planned to offer local service, no matter how small. A tiny unincorporated village (like Odessa, Ontario, with no telephone central office but still listed as a rate centre) usually received multiple 10,000-number blocks. Once a number is assigned to a rate centre and CLEC, it is unavailable for use elsewhere, even in cases when a rate centre has more numbers than it needs. Larger municipalities have multiple rate centres and multiple competing carriers in each. For instance, even though Ottawa has been a single municipality since merging with the Regional Municipality of Ottawa–Carleton in 2001, it still has 11 rate centres (plus portions of other rate centres primarily located beyond the city limits) – most with very similar local calling areas – which have never been amalgamated. The "Ottawa–Hull" exchange only covers the area that was the city of Ottawa prior to the 2001 amalgamation, plus the former suburbs of Nepean (central part) and Vanier and small sections of other urban communities.

Since Canada does not use number pooling as a relief measure, many telephone numbers of the area code remained unused. The proliferation of cell phones and pagers, particularly in the larger cities in the 613 area (Ottawa, Kingston, Belleville, etc.) only magnified the problem.  By 2006, the only remaining unassigned exchange prefixes in the entire 819 region were numbers which could not be assigned to the Quebec side of the Ottawa–Hull area without breaking seven-digit dialling between Hull and Ottawa.

Ten-digit dialling in 613 and 819 became mandatory on October 21, 2006. Intraprovincial calls from rate centres with no local calling beyond a small fragment of their own area code were returning intercept messages if dialled as seven digits. Exchange protection in the National Capital Region was ended, except for the "dual dialability" scheme for government numbers on both sides of the river. This situation could have been avoided had some 1-613 versions of seven-digit Ottawa-Hull numbers been assigned to areas a safe distance from the National Capital Region years earlier.

Within two years, it became apparent that a new area code was necessary due to the continued number allocation problem – an issue exacerbated by the proliferation of cell phones and pagers.  A geographic split was quickly ruled out.  Local telephone companies did not want the expense and burden of changing existing customers' numbers, which would have required en masse reprogramming of cell phones.  As a result, overlay area codes were proposed for both 613 and 819.

Area code 343, an overlay proposed in 2007, and approved by the Canadian Radio-television and Telecommunications Commission on September 10, 2008, was activated for the region on May 17, 2010, several years earlier than originally anticipated.

On 10 November 2021, the Canadian Numbering Administrator approved an additional overlay code for the numbering plan area 613/343. Area code 753 has been assigned, and will be activated on March 26, 2022.<ref>NANP [https://www.nationalnanpa.com/planning_letters/PL-571.pdf Planning Letter PL-571] (2021-11-10)</ref>

Carriers
The main incumbent local exchange carrier in area code 613 is Bell Canada, but there are some five independent companies serving rural exchanges: the Lansdowne Rural Telephone Company, serving Lansdowne; the North Frontenac Telephone Company, serving Sharbot Lake and Parham; the North Renfrew Telephone Company, serving Beachburg, Westmeath, and the area outside Pembroke; the Roxborough Telephone Company, serving Moose Creek; and the Westport Telephone Company, serving Westport.

Also served by area code 613 and Bell Canada is Saint-Régis, Quebec. The exchange covers the Mohawk nation territory of Akwesasne, which straddles the Ontario–Québec–New York border. Calls from Saint-Régis to Fort Covington, New York, are local although they cross an international border.

In the west, Rapides-des-Joachims, Quebec, shares an exchange with the adjacent Rolphton, Ontario.

Communities and central office codes

Adolphustown (Greater Napanee) – (613): 373
Addington Highlands (township): see Denbigh, Northbrook
Alexandria (North Glengarry) – (343): 432 474, (613): 525, 642
For the municipality "Alfred and Plantagenet", see Alfred and Plantagenet
Alfred (Alfred and Plantagenet) – (343): 371, 691, 789, (613): 605, 679, 708
Almonte – (343): 372, 760, (613): 256, 461
Arden (Central Frontenac) – (343): 268, (613): 335
Arnprior – (343): 373, 761, (613): 622, 623, 626
Athens – (613): 924, 927
Avonmore (North Stormont) – (343): 433, (613): 346
Bancroft – (343): 269, 357, 401, 476, 943, (613): 202, 303, 318, 332, 334, 412, 442, 553, 630
Barry's Bay – (613): 756
Bath (Loyalist Township) – (613): 351, 352, 881
Beachburg (Whitewater Region) – (613): 582
For the municipality of Belleville, see Belleville and Thurlow (former township now in the city)
Belleville – (343): 261, 263, 270, 355, 362, 600, 645, 889, (613): 210, 242, 243, 391, 403, 438, 480, 554, 661, 689, 707, 743, 771, 779, 813, 827, 847, 848, 849, 885, 902, 919, 920, 921, 922, 961, 962, 966, 967, 968, 969, 970
Bloomfield (Prince Edward County) – (613): 393
Bourget – (343): 374, 762, (613): 426, 487, 603
Brighton – (343): 271, (613): 439, 475, 481, 814
Brockville – (343): 225, 264, 300, 320, 327, 480, (613): 213, 246, 340, 341, 342, 345, 349, 423, 498, 499, 556, 640, 704, 802, 803, 865
Calabogie (Greater Madawaska) – (613): 752
Cardiff (Highlands East) – (613): 338
Cardinal (Edwardsburgh/Cardinal) – (613): 655, 657, 671
Carleton Place – (343): 213, 285, 375, 503, 763, (613): 250, 251, 253, 257, 418, 434, 451, 452, 456, 492, 508, 621, 964
Carp – (343): 376, 764, (613): 470, 839
Casselman – (343): 377, 765, (613): 427, 764
Central Frontenac (township): see Arden, Parham
Chalk River – (613): 589
Chesterville (North Dundas) – (343): 378, 766, (613): 436, 448
For the city "Clarence-Rockland", see Clarence Creek and Rockland
Clarence Creek (Clarence-Rockland) – (343): 379, 767, (613): 420, 488
Cobden – (613): 646, 647
Coe Hill (Wollaston) – (613): 337
Constance Bay (Ottawa) – (343): 380, 768, (613): 578, 832
Cornwall – (343): 288, 301, 330, 356, 370, 431, 444, 475, 585, 885, (613): 209, 330, 360, 361, 362, 363, 505, 551, 571, 577, 662, 703, 861, 870, 930, 931, 932, 933, 935, 936, 937, 938
Crysler (North Stormont) – (343): 381, (613): 987
Cumberland – (343): 382, 769, (613): 467, 517, 573, 833, 892
Deep River – (613): 584
Delta – (613): 616, 928
Denbigh (Addington Highlands) – (613): 333
Deseronto – (343): 265, (613): 309, 396
Douglas (Admaston/Bromley) – (613): 649
East Hawkesbury (township): see St. Eugene
Edwardsburgh/Cardinal (township): see Cardinal, Spencerville
Eganville – (613): 628
Elgin (Rideau Lakes) – (613): 359
Embrun – (343): 383, 770, (613): 370, 443, 557
Enterprise (Stone Mills) – (613): 358
Finch (North Stormont) – (343): 434, (613): 984
Foymount – (613): 754
Frankford (Quinte West) – (613): 398, 486
For the municipality of Frontenac Islands, see Wolfe Island, Kingston
Gananoque – (343): 479, (613): 381, 382, 463, 718, 815
Gilmour (Tudor and Cashel) – (613): 474
Glen Robertson (North Glengarry) – (343): 435, (613): 874
Gloucester (Ottawa) – (343): 384, 771, (613): 425, 455, 502, 822
Golden Lake (North Algona Wilberforce) – (613): 625
 For Greater Madawaska (township), see Calabogie
 For the municipality "Greater Napanee", see Adolphustown, Napanee, Selby
Harrowsmith – (613): 372
Hawkesbury – (343): 500, (613): 306, 307, 632, 636
Ingleside (South Stormont) – (343): 436, (613): 522, 537
Inverary (South Frontenac) – (613): 353, 653
Iroquois (South Dundas) – (343): 437, (613): 652, 669
Jockvale (Ottawa) – (343): 212, 303, 385, 772, (613): 440, 459, 512, 823, 825, 843
Kanata–Stittsville (Ottawa) – (343): 359 386 667 690, 773, (613): 254, 270, 271, 280, 287, 383, 435, 457, 509, 519, 576, 591, 592, 595, 599, 609, 663, 801, 831, 836, 886, 895, 963, 974, 977
Kemptville (North Grenville) – (343): 387, 774, (613): 215, 258, 713
Killaloe – (613): 757
Kingston – (343): 266, 290, 302, 333, 344, 358, 363, 364, 422, 477, 884, 989, (613): 214, 217, 305, 328, 329, 331, 344, 384, 389, 417, 449, 453, 483, 484, 507, 514, 530, 531, 532, 533, 536, 539, 540, 541, 542, 544, 545, 546, 547, 548, 549, 561, 572, 583, 634, 650, 766, 767, 770, 776, 777, 817, 840, 856, 876, 877, 887, 888, 893, 900, 929, 985
L'Orignal (Champlain Township) – (343): 438, (613): 675
Lanark Highlands (township), see Lanark, McDonalds Corners
Lanark – (613): 259
Lancaster (South Glengarry) – (343): 439, (613): 313, 347
Lansdowne (Leeds and the Thousand Islands) – (613): 659
Leeds and the Thousand Islands (township): see Lansdowne, Mallorytown, Seeleys Bay
Long Sault (South Stormont) – (343): 440, (613): 534, 550
Loyalist Township, see Bath and Odessa
Maberly (Tay Valley) – (613): 268
Madoc – (343): 472, (613): 473, 666
Maitland – (613): 320, 348, 664
Mallorytown – (613): 923, 973
Manotick (Ottawa) – (343): 214, 388, 775, (613): 491, 692, 908
Marmora – (613): 472, 644
Martintown (South Glengarry) – (343): 441, (613): 528
Maxville (North Glengarry) – (343): 442, (613): 527
Maynooth (Hastings Highlands) – (613): 338
McDonalds Corners (Lanark Highlands) – (613): 278
Merrickville (Merrickville-Wolford) – (343) 340 389, (613): 269
Metcalfe (Ottawa) – (343) 390, 776, (613): 574, 821
Mississippi Mills (township): see Pakenham
Moose Creek (North Stormont) – (613): 538
Morrisburg – (343): 443, (613): 543, 643
Napanee (Greater Napanee) – (343): 267, 478, (613): 308, 354, 409, 462
Navan (Ottawa) – (343) 391, 778, (613): 429, 835
Newburgh (Stone Mills) – (613): 378
North Algona Wilberforce: see Golden Lake
North Augusta – (613): 665, 926
North Dundas (township): see Chesterville, South Mountain and Winchester
North Glengarry (township): see Alexandria, Glen Robertson, Maxville
North Gower (Ottawa) – (343): 392, 779, (613): 489, 493
North Stormont (township): see Avonmore, Crysler, Finch, Moose Creek
Northbrook (Addington Highlands) – (343): 272, 336
Odessa (Loyalist Township) – (613): 386, 896
Orleans (Ottawa) – (343): 221, 393, 780, (613): 424, 458, 510, 590, 824, 830, 834, 837, 841, 845
Osgoode (Ottawa) – (343): 394, 467, 781, 955 (613): 465, 469, 516, 826, (753): 200
In Ontario, the Ottawa–Hull exchange covers the pre-2001 city of Ottawa, from Nepean to Vanier only. For the municipality of Ottawa, see Ottawa–Hull, Constance Bay, Gloucester, Jockvale, Kanata, Manotick, Metcalfe, Navan, North Gower, Orléans, Osgoode.
Ottawa–Hull city centre – (343): 200, 201, 203, 244, 262, 291, 292, 360, 488, 540, 541, 542, 666, 688, 689, 700, 777, 882, 883, 887, 888, 925, 988, 998, 999, (613): 203, 204, 212, 216, 218, 219, 220, 221, 222, 223, 224, 225, 226, 227, 228, 229, 230, 231, 232, 233, 234, 235, 236, 237, 238, 239, 240, 241, 244, 245, 247, 248, 249, 252, 255, 260, 261, 262, 263, 265, 266, 274, 276, 277, 282, 286, 288, 290, 291, 292, 293, 294, 295, 296, 297, 298, 299, 301, 302, 304, 314, 315, 316, 317, 319, 321, 322, 323, 324, 325, 327, 350, 355, 356, 357, 364, 366, 368, 369, 371, 380, 400, 402, 404, 406, 407, 408, 410, 413, 415, 416, 421, 422, 437, 447, 454, 462. 482, 500, 501, 513, 514, 515, 518, 520, 521, 523, 526, 552, 558, 560, 562, 563, 564, 565, 566, 567, 569, 580, 581, 593, 594, 596, 597, 598, 600, 601, 604, 606, 607, 608, 612, 614, 615, 617, 618, 619, 620, 627, 656, 660, 667, 668, 670, 680, 683, 686, 688, 690, 691, 693, 694, 695, 696, 697, 698, 699, 700, 701, 702, 709, 710, 712, 714, 715, 716, 719, 720, 721, 722, 723, 724, 725, 726, 727, 728, 729, 730, 731, 733, 734, 736, 737, 738, 739, 740, 741, 742, 744, 745, 746, 747, 748, 749, 750, 751, 755, 759, 760, 761, 762, 763, 765, 768, 769, 773, 778, 780, 781, 782, 783, 784, 785, 786, 787, 788, 789, 790, 791, 792, 793, 794, 795, 796, 797, 798, 799, 800, 804, 805, 806, 807, 808, 809, 816, 818, 820, 828, 829, 842, 844, 850, 851, 852, 853, 854, 857, 858, 859, 860, 862, 863, 864, 866, 867, 868, 869, 875, 878, 880, 882, 883, 884, 889, 890, 891, 894, 897, 898, 899, 901, 903, 904, 907, 909, 910, 912, 913, 914, 915, 916, 917, 934, 940, 941, 943, 944, 945, 946, 947, 948, 949, 951, 952, 953, 954, 956, 957, 960, 971, 978, 979, 981, 983, 986, 990, 991, 992, 993, 994, 995, 996, 997, 998, 999, 934p, 939p, 953p, 956p, 994p, 997p 
Pakenham (Mississippi Mills) – (343): 395, (613): 624
Palmer Rapids (Brudenell, Lyndoch and Raglan) – (613): 758
Parham (Central Frontenac) – (613): 375
Pembroke independent – (613): 638
Pembroke – (343): 369, 430, 544, (613): 281, 312, 401, 504, 559, 585, 602, 629, 631, 633, 635, 639, 717, 732, 735, 775
Perth – (343): 341, 400, 402, (613): 200, 201, 264, 267, 300, 326, 390, 464, 466, 714, 772, 812
Petawawa – (613): 506, 588, 685, 687
Picton (Prince Edward County) – (343): 222, (613): 471, 476, 503, 645, 654, 846, 906
Plantagenet (Alfred and Plantagenet) – (343): 396, 783, (613): 405, 673
Plevna (North Frontenac) – (343): 273, (613): 479
Portland (Rideau Lakes) – (613): 272, 972
Prescott – (613): 529, 918, 925, 975
For the municipality of Quinte West, see Frankford, Trenton and Wooler
Renfrew – (343): 361, (613): 431, 432, 433, 570
For the municipality of Prince Edward County, see Picton, Bloomfield, Wellington
Richmond – (343): 200, 397, 784, (613): 444, 838
Rideau Lakes (township): see Elgin, Portland
Rockland (Clarence-Rockland) – (343): 200, 398, 785, (613): 419, 446
Rolphton (Laurentian Hills) – (613): 586
Russell – (343): 399, 786, (613): 445, 496
Seeleys Bay (Leeds and the Thousand Islands) – (613): 387
Selby (Greater Napanee) – (613): 388
Sharbot Lake – (613): 279
Smiths Falls – (343): 800, 881, (613): 205, 206, 207, 283, 284, 285, 414, 418, 430, 485, 682, 706, 855, 980, 982, 988
South Dundas (township): see Iroquois, Morrisburg, Williamsburg
South Frontenac (township): see Harrowsmith, Inverary, Sydenham, Verona
South Glengarry (township): see Lancaster, Martintown
South Mountain (North Dundas) – (343): 345, (613): 989
South Stormont (township): see Ingleside, Long Sault
Spencerville (Edwardsburgh/Cardinal) – (613): 648, 658
Saint Regis (Akwesasane) – (343): 447, (613): 575
St. Eugene (East Hawkesbury) – (343): 445, (613): 674
St. Isidore – (343): 446, (613): 524
Stirling (Stirling–Rawdon) – (613): 395, 490
Stone Mills (township): see Enterprise, Newburgh, Yarker
Sydenham (South Frontenac) – (613): 376
Tamworth – (613): 379
Thurlow (Belleville) – (613): 477, 494
Toledo (Elizabethtown-Kitley) – (613): 275
Trenton (Quinte West) – (613): 208, 392, 394, 495, 651, 681, 955, 965
Tweed – (613): 478
Vankleek Hill – (343): 304, 448, 473 886, (613): 676, 677, 678, 684, 872
Verona (South Frontenac) – (613): 374
Wellington (Prince Edward County) – (613): 399
Westmeath (Whitewater Region) – (613): 587
Westport – (613): 273
Whitewater Region: see Beachburg, Westmeath
Whitney (South Algonquin) – (613): 637
Williamsburg (South Dundas) – (343): 449, (613): 535, 641
Winchester (North Dundas) – (343) 346, 787, (613): 441, 774
Wolfe Island (Frontenac Islands) – (613): 385
Wollaston: see Coe Hill
Wooler (Quinte West) – (613): 397, 497
Yarker (Stone Mills) – (613): 377
shared-cost service – (613): 310

p = Protected against assignment in both 819 and 613 – Government of Canada offices''

See also
List of North American area codes

References

External links
CNA exchange list for area +1-613
CNA exchange list for area +1-343
Relief Planning
Area Code Map of Canada

613
Communications in Ontario